The United States competed at the 2014 Summer Youth Olympics, in Nanjing, China from 16 August to 28 August 2014. 92 athletes across 19 sports participated.

Medalists

Athletics

United States qualified 16 athletes.

Qualification Legend: Q=Final A (medal); qB=Final B (non-medal); qC=Final C (non-medal); qD=Final D (non-medal); qE=Final E (non-medal)

Boys
Track & road events

Field Events

Girls
Track & road events

Field events

Basketball

United States qualified a girls' team from their performance at the 2013 U18 3x3 World Championships.

Skills Competition

Girls' Tournament

Roster
 De'Janae Boykin
 Napheesa Collier
 Arike Ogunbowale
 Katie Samuelson

Group stage

Knockout Stage

Beach volleyball

United States qualified a girls' team by winning the NORCECA Central Zone Qualifier and qualified a boys' team by their performance at the NORCECA Final YOG Qualifier.

Boxing

United States qualified four boxers based on its performance at the 2014 AIBA Youth World Championships.

Boys

Girls

Canoeing

United States qualified one boat based on its performance at the 2013 World Junior Canoe Sprint and Slalom Championships.

Boys

Diving

United States qualified four quotas based on its performance at the Nanjing 2014 Diving Qualifying Event.

Fencing

United States qualified six athletes based on its performance at the 2014 FIE Cadet World Championships.

Boys
Group stage

Knockout Stage

Girls
Group stage

Knockout Stage

Mixed Team

Gymnastics

Artistic Gymnastics

United States qualified one athlete based on its performance at the 2014 Junior Pan American Artistic Gymnastics Championships.

Boys

Rhythmic Gymnastics

United States qualified one athlete based on its performance at the 2014 Junior Pan American Rhythmic Championships.

Individual

Trampoline

United States qualified two athletes based on its performance at the 2014 Junior Pan American Trampoline Championships.

Judo

United States qualified one athlete based on its performance at the 2013 Cadet World Judo Championships.

Individual

Team

Modern Pentathlon

United States qualified one athlete based on its performance at the 2014 Youth A World Championships.

Rowing

United States qualified two boats based on its performance at the 2013 World Rowing Junior Championships.

Qualification Legend: FA=Final A (medal); FB=Final B (non-medal); FC=Final C (non-medal); FD=Final D (non-medal); SA/B=Semifinals A/B; SC/D=Semifinals C/D; R=Repechage

Rugby Sevens

United States qualified a boys' and girls' team based on its performance at the 2013 Rugby World Cup Sevens.

Boys' Tournament

Roster

 Cian Barry
 Hanco Germishuys
 Brian Hannon
 Junior Helu
 Vili Helu
 Sione Masoe
 Aaron Matthews
 Malcolm May
 Suwaiter Poch
 Tyler Sousley
 Austin Taefu

Group stage

Knockout Stage

Girls' Tournament

Roster

 Tess Feury
 Haley Langan
 Apaau Mailau
 Michel Navarro
 Dana Olsen
 Tiffany Person
 Emily Prentice
 Kat Ramage
 Becca Rosko
 Richelle Stephens
 Danielle Walko-Siua
 Whitney Wilson

Group stage

Knockout Stage

Sailing

United States qualified a Byte CII boat based on its performance at the 2013 World Byte CII Championships. United States later qualified a Techno 293 boat based on its performance at the Techno 293 North American & Caribbean Continental Qualifiers.

Swimming

United States qualified eight swimmers.

Boys

Girls

Mixed

Table Tennis

United States qualified a female athlete based on the ITTF Under-18 World Rankings. Later United States qualified a male athlete based on its performance at the North American Qualification Event.

Singles

Team

Qualification Legend: Q=Main Bracket (medal); qB=Consolation Bracket (non-medal)

Taekwondo

United States qualified one athlete, Kendall Yount, based on her performance at the Taekwondo Qualification Tournament.

Girls

Tennis

United States qualified two athletes based on the 9 June 2014 ITF World Junior Rankings.

Singles

Doubles

Triathlon

United States qualified two athletes based on its performance at the 2014 American Youth Olympic Games Qualifier.

Individual

Relay

Weightlifting

United States qualified 1 quota in the boys' and girls' events based on the team ranking after the 2014 Weightlifting Youth Pan American Championships.

Boys

Girls

Wrestling

United States qualified three athletes based on its performance at the 2014 Pan American Cadet Championships.

Boys

References

2014 in American sports
Nations at the 2014 Summer Youth Olympics
United States at the Youth Olympics